is a private secondary school in Nagoya, Japan.

Tōkai was founded in 1888. It has been ranked as No.1 in Japan concerning the number of students admitted to medical departments at national universities in Japan for the past 8 years since 2008. According to Sunday Mainichi published on April 17, 2016, the number of students at Tōkai High School admitted to medical departments at national universities in Japan in 2016 was 109.

Notable alumni

  (professor of global environmental Studies at Kyoto University)
  (president of The Bank of Tokyo-Mitsubishi UFJ)
 Toshiki Kaifu (76th and 77th Prime Minister of Japan)
 Masaaki Kanda (former governor of Aichi Prefecture)
 Taro Kimura (journalist)
  (professor of graduate school of human environmental studies at Kyoto University)
  (professor of engineering at Kyoto University)
  (NHK presenter)
 Shigefumi Mori (mathematician who won the Fields Medal)
  (associate professor of agriculture at Kyoto University)
 Arimasa Osawa (author who won the Naoki Prize)
 Hidehiko Saito (professor of medical department at Nagoya University)
  (professor of graduate school of human environmental studies at Kyoto University)
 Takeshi Umehara (president of the Kyoto City University of Arts)
  (professor of physical statistics laboratory at Kyoto University)
  (former chairman of Brother Industries)

References

External links
  

High schools in Aichi Prefecture
Private schools in Japan
Education in Nagoya